Elise Blackwell is an American novelist and writer. She is the author of five novels, as well as numerous short stories and essays. Her books have been translated into five languages, adapted for the stage, and served as the inspiration for the song "When the War Came" by The Decemberists. She is host and organizer of the literary series The Open Book at the University of South Carolina, where she also teaches. In 2019, she was inducted into the South Carolina Academy of Authors.

References

External links

21st-century American novelists
American women novelists
Louisiana State University alumni
University of California, Irvine alumni
Year of birth missing (living people)
People from Baton Rouge, Louisiana
21st-century American women